This is a list of characters from The King of Fighters: Maximum Impact series that play their own roles in the overall The King of Fighters story. Because these games occur in an alternate universe separate from their 2D counterparts, characters exclusive to these games are listed here. All of the original characters listed here are also created and designed by Maximum Impact producer, Falcoon.

Introduced in KOF: Maximum Impact

Alba Meira 

 is a fictional character from SNK Playmore's fighting game series, The King of Fighters: Maximum Impact, a spin-off of The King of Fighters. Alba is the main protagonist of this series, along with his twin brother Soiree Meira. He also makes an appearance in the ONA "The King of Fighters: Another Day" and the dating simulation game, Days of Memories~His and My Hot Summer.

In his official blog, Falcoon addresses that both Meira brothers were initially conceptualized to be the KOF counterparts to Fatal Fury stars, Terry and Andy Bogard, given the game's setting is the same as their predecessors. The designing process for both brothers lead to the idea of alternate (or Another as it is addressed in Maximum Impact) costumes for each character. Several of the brothers' prototype designs were assigned to other characters' alternate outfits; in this case, Alba's prototype design became Rock's alternate outfit. Additionally, Alba's original fighting style was going to be traditional boxing or karate, but it was deemed to be too common in comparison to his brother's customized capoeira. In a later entry, Falcoon adds that he was originally displeased with Alba's presentation in the first game as it didn't meet with his expectations for the character at the time. Once he was named producer for the sequel, Falcoon took extra care to make Alba present himself as he intended: the stylish and "all-mighty" character. Series scenario writer Akihiko Ureshino states that the Meira siblings became twin brothers to avoid comparison with other brother characters from other SNK games, such as the Kazama brothers from the Samurai Shodown series and the Jin brothers also from Fatal Fury. He also addresses that the main complaint received from fans were concerns of the brothers "not looking alike"; in response, Akihiko admits that he was also unaware of Alba and Soiree being siblings until much later in production and shares his confusion with fans to this day.

At age 3, Alba lost his parents in an accident and was raised in an orphanage in Germany along with his "younger" twin brother, Soiree. By age 14, the two ran away and settled in Southtown where they were mentored by Fate, the city's boss at that time. However, four years later, Alba left Fate to live on his own. But during this time, Fate was killed in a turf-war with rivaling gang Mephistopheles. Alba was prompted to return to exact vengeance for Fate's death against Mephistopheles' head boss, Duke, only to discover that Duke wasn't the culprit. Though his vengeance was left unfulfilled, Alba's reputation within Southtown skyrocketed and he became the city's new, yet reluctant top-dog following Duke's downfall. Nevertheless, he makes the most of his status to keep the pieces within the city alongside his brother and fellow gang members.

In KOF: Maximum Impact 2, Alba meets Luise and Jivatma, leader of Kusiel/Kushieru, who both mention something about Alba and Soiree's past and their connection to a being called Eudaim/Judeim. At the very end of Alba's ending, he speaks in a double voice. This happened in both the English and Japanese versions, so it is hinted that Alba is starting to become aware of his existence as Eudaim/Judeim. According to the online novels in the Japanese Maximum Impact 2 official page, Alba defeated Jivatma and won the tournament.

Chae Lim 

Chae Lim (Hangul:채림; Hanja: 蔡琳; Japanese: チェ・リム Che Rimu) is a fictional character from the SNK Playmore fighting game series The King of Fighters: Maximum Impact, part of The King of Fighters series. She is the second female Tae Kwon Do fighter in the KOF series -after May Lee- but the first to perform the art and wear a dobok.

Originally, Kim Kaphwan was going to enter the first entry of the Maximum Impact series under the pseudonym "Mr. Taekwondo" -in the same fashion as Art of Fighting Mr. Karate. Due to veteran designers' complaints and other difficulties at the time, it was finally decided to leave Kim out of the game's lineup but add another character like him to replace his absence. While several other characters were considered for the spot -including other SNK characters such as Jhun Hoon, May Lee, and Buriki One character Seo Yong Song- a fellow developer voiced interest in creating another female Taekwondo fighter with the same "professional" manner as Kim, which eventually formed the basis for Chae Lim. To set her apart from these characters, Chae was made to be the struggling student who was not as adept as her peers or mentor but possessed a dominating determination. Ureshino depicts her relation with Kim as a "father-daughter relationship", adding that she is a young woman with Kim's potential.

Chae began learning Tae Kwon Do at the age of four. She is rumored to be Kim's secret weapon for the King of Fighters tournaments. The Maximum Impact tournament marks her professional debut. Though she seems to inherit Kim's seriousness in battle, she reverts to being a normal girl when she takes off her gloves and enjoys being with her friends on her spare time.

Duke 

 is a fictional character from the SNK Playmore's fighting game series The King of Fighters: Maximum Impact, part of The King of Fighters series. He is the main boss in the first game but enters as a playable character in KOF: Maximum Impact 2.

Duke was conceptualized as a gang boss who wore "gorgeous clothing" and "has been through a lot". Falcoon originally designed a younger man in his twenties with a Japanese sword, similar in appearance to The Last Blade Shinnosuke Kagami or Garou: Mark of the Wolves Kain R. Heinlein. Like other characters of the game, he underwent a number of retakes until the development team firmly requested for a "strong bodied and serious man in his thirties". He was specifically made to seem as though he's suppressing himself from his true potential. Concerning his involvement with the Meira brothers and their mentor Fate, the brothers only saw a figure of Duke's stature during the time of the incident and initially mistaken Seth for Fate's murder. This concept, however, was rewritten upon the sequel's release.

He was the King of Southtown and the leader of the Mephistopheles gang, a sub-syndicate of the underworld organization Addes. He answers to Jivatma, who he used to work for before he became Mephistopheles' leader. He apparently underwent a surgical modification early on after his parents vanished (he has a scar across his neck from this, which he rubs frequently). He underwent the surgery so that Addes would cure his sister, who died for an unknown reason. Because of their surgical enhancements, Jivatma refers to him as Type "D" (although he hates this name) and his underling, Nagase, as Type "N". During The King of Fighters: Maximum Impact, he had had a "D" on the back of his shirt; this was changed to a more tribal design afterwards.

Duke enters the second tournament to "redeem" himself after being defeated by Alba, thereby losing his position as the King of Southtown. Currently, Duke is seen as a traitor to Addes, although he is a member of The Children of Kovakiel (a group of Addes' top authorities). He is connected to Lien Neville in that he is responsible for her parents' death but spared her life (In Lien's MI2 story mode it is stated that Duke spared Lien and raised her because he lost his sister). Duke is also responsible for the death of Fate, Alba and Soiree's mentor, as he was defended by Lien. Duke was last seen placing flowers over the grave of his sister in the credits of KOF: Maximum Impact 2.

Lien Neville 

 is a buxom fictional character from the SNK Playmore's fighting game series The King of Fighters: Maximum Impact, part of The King of Fighters series. She also makes an appearance in the ONA "The King of Fighters: Another Day".

She conceptually began as a contrast to fellow KOF participant, Mai Shiranui. While Mai represents a "sexy and beautiful kunoichi", Lien represents another counterpart: the "sexy Western femme fatale". Her outfits are purposely designed to be "tight and constricting" to contrast Mai's clothing, which is made to allow for easy and quick movements. Her curled hair -also made to differ from Mai's long and straight hair- needed several retakes, along with a long trial-and-error process for the game's modelers. To further the contrast between the two assassins, efforts were made to make Lien more serious and darker than Mai, despite being one of the heroines in the series.

When she was ten years old, her parents were killed by Duke - due to her father trying to escape his terms with the Addes syndicate. Though Duke was under orders to kill everyone on site, Lien was spared and then raised by her parents' murderer to become an elite assassin under his employment. Since then, she swore to avenge her parents' deaths and made Duke her target of unrelenting hate - later with deeper feelings for him due to the time they spent together. Under Duke's orders, she fought Alba and Soiree's mentor, Fate, in a fair match that resulted with his death. When she hears that Jivatma had issued the order to kill her parents, she redirects her vengeance to Addes. She was last seen next to Duke during Maximum Impact 2's credits.

She fights using an array of close combat techniques. According to Falcoon, she is the sequel's weakest character.

Mignon Beart 

 is the older sister to Ninon Beart and the self-proclaimed rival to Athena Asamiya. Mignon also appears in the dating simulation game, Days of Memories~Pure White Angels.

Similar to how Lien contrasts Mai, Mignon was designed to be the rival to Athena. Keywords to creating her persona were "innocent, defiant, but a little [censored]", which Falcoon admits is best seen through her actions rather than her figure. Her design is based on typically "cute idol" traits, particularly her boots, her manner of referring to herself in third-person, and her alternate catgirl costume. Her magical powers were created to counter Athena's Psycho Powers, which is interpreted by Falcoon to be akin to witchcraft. She was initially not well received by Ureshino and other veteran staff, deeming her to not entirely fit the mood of the King of Fighters universe -though they lightened their impressions after considering the presence of Psycho Soldier members and other "orthodox" characters. As her character further developed, she became the "stupid but cute" character, Ureshino using the term as a simple means of endearment.

She is an apprentice white magic witch whose grand goal is to bring peace to the world through magic. Whether a fault of her fine breeding or not, Mignon knows little of determining the tenor of circumstances around her but once she has decided on something, she has the strength of will to fulfill her goal. She believes that her grandmother was a genuine witch and that one day she will be able to open the jewel box that she received from her grandmother, thus becoming a real witch. Her attacks use various elements, such as wind, water, fire, and lightning.

Soiree Meira 

 is one of the main characters of KOF: Maximum Impact and the "younger" twin brother to Alba Meira. In Falcoon's official blog, he addresses that both Meira brothers were initially conceptualized to be the KOF counterparts to Fatal Fury stars, Terry and Andy Bogard, an idea also requested by the development staff. The designing process for both brothers lead to the idea of alternate costumes for each character. Several of the brothers' prototype designs were assigned to other characters' alternate outfits; in this case, Soiree's prototype design became Maxima's alternate outfit. Changes done to Soiree were also made to balance the designing process for Alba. Series scenario writer, Akihko Ureshino, adds that they happily became twin brothers to avoid comparison with other brother characters from previous SNK games, such as the Kazama brothers from Samurai Shodown and the Jin brothers also from Fatal Fury. He also addresses that the main complaint received from fans were concerns of the brothers "not looking alike"; in response, Ureshino admits that he was also unaware of Alba and Soiree being siblings until much later in production and shares his confusion with fans to this day.

Soiree is very cheerful, magnanimous, and passionate, but he is also quick-tempered. He has always idolized his older twin brother, Alba. At the age of three, Soiree lost his parents to an accident and was raised in an orphanage along with Alba. The day he turned 14, he escaped the orphanage together with his brother and settled in Southtown. Fate, the city's boss at that time, took them under his wing, altering the wariness of the two brothers toward adults. Soiree believes that the only power is Alba's power. In KOF: Maximum Impact 2, Soiree's story has him encounter Luise and Jivatma and this in turn cause him to become aware of the being called Eudaim/Judeim. He vanishes without a trace after Jivatma's defeat. Even though he wasn't at the finals, according to the official story, Alba was. However, the result of Soiree Meira's disappearance is still the same.

The base of his fighting style originated from Fatal Fury character, Richard Meyer.

Introduced in KOF: Maximum Impact 2

Hyena 

 is a fictional character from the SNK Playmore's fighting game series The King of Fighters: Maximum Impact, part of The King of Fighters series. He appears during story scenarios in the first game but enters as an unlockable playable character in KOF: Maximum Impact 2.

When creating his design, Falcoon's main objective was to make a man looks best in a green suit. His wacky gestures and his annoyed face were created to add an off-beat character to the cast. His role in the series is to serve as the cowardly yet boastful "new recruit", best shown in his ineptness during fights and his groveling to Duke. He was originally not going to be a player character in the second game, but was requested by Falcoon to be placed into the roster. His lines during gameplay were devised in a collaborative effort between Hyena, Alba, and Soiree's voice actor who became good friends during the length of the project.

He was previously Duke's henchman who acts as his messenger to challengers during the first tournament -later established mostly due to his personal fear of Duke. After Duke's defeat and Mephistopheles collapse, he goes into hiding and develops his own fighting style to protect himself. He gains a reputation as a fighter in the underworld media and is invited to KOF to participate.

As Hyena's fighting techniques are very clumsy and unfocused, he is likely meant to be more of a joke character. One of Hyena's supermoves, This Century's Most Fearsome Acting, shows him dying instantly from a hit by an opponent, and then springing back to life with an enigmatic kick move. In competitive play, many save it until near death so the fake KO would look realistic. Using This Century's Most Fearsome Acting comes with a price, however. If Hyena is subjected to a throw by the opposing character, he will be knocked out instantly, making this move more subjective to timing and defensive purposes. In Maximum Impact: Regulation A, Hyena gained a new super move - "Hyena's Joke" which is a parody on Oswald's LDM - "Joker". The same input is required to perform the move and Hyena repeats Oswald's phrase when the move connects.

Jivatma  

 is the leader of Kusiel/Kushieru, a sub-syndicate of the secret syndicate Addes that trains assassins, and a member of Addes' top leaders, The Children of Kokabiel, but his origins and history are veiled in mystery. He was Duke's boss until Duke became leader of his own gang, Mephistopheles. He has frightening abilities, using a fighting style he boasts as punishment to the weak.

His normal model was designed under the impression of a cockroach while his Another model became a moth -to contrast the butterfly for Luise. When asked about Jivatma's female Another design, Falcoon states that it was created nearing the end of Jivatma's  development. The design was made partially due to the gender ambiguity of Jivatma's Japanese vocal performance and off-hand comment by Ureshino about the character's overall design. He nicknamed her "Hermes".

Jivatma is also connected to Alba, Soiree, Duke, Nagase, Lien, and Luise. He calls Alba and Soiree Meira, "Eudaim/Judeim", a being who is currently unknown and shrouded in mystery, and can activate "Eudaim's/Judeim's" presence in the two Meira brothers. He is responsible for Soiree's disappearance, although it is believed that Soiree may return in the third game, possibly as a villain. He refers to Duke and Nagase as Type "D" and Type "N" respectively, recognizing them as humans who have been modified by Jalange, Addes' surgeon. Jivatma ordered the death of Lien's parents and family because her father would not join Addes. He is strongly connected to Luise in that she is a Zoan, and his goal is to collect strong host bodies so that Zoans like her can return home. Several pieces of information from his profile, suggest he is a parasitic or symbiotic alien who lives in other's bodies. (This is supported by the fact Jivatma mentions in most characters stories that he needs 'strong bodies.")

Jivatma's attacks mostly involve stretching his limbs. Jivatma has an alternate combat-mode stance, although a CPU-controlled Jivatma will never enter it.

Luise Meyrink 

 is a mysterious woman with a strange and regal appearance. In her profile, it states that Luise is the daughter of Professor Detlev Meyrink, a well-known and respected authority on rocket science. She enters KOF in search of him when he was kidnapped by the syndicate Addes. She seems to be a naturally talented fighter, and ambiguously warns challengers about Jivatma's plans. She also knows information regarding Alba's and Soiree's past and the being "Eudaim/Judeim", but chooses to not divulge this to them in detail.

Both of her designs follow a butterfly motif, specifically after the Morpho butterfly. Her in-game information is unique in that her profile and storyline were written to be deliberately different from one another. Her character role is to serve as the "older sister with years of experience" as well as the median between both Meira brothers.

During her storyline, it is revealed that she is one of the last members of the ageless alien race known as the Zoan. Jivatma refers to her various times in the game as "Lakia", most likely her original name. Her real motive for the tournament is to pursue and destroy beings such as Jivatma, an entity who has caused mischief and murdered several Zoan in an undisclosed past incident. He tempts her to join him in exchange for a spaceship trip back to her home, but she refuses and prefers to wait until human kind can travel space naturally. During the game's credits, she and Alba are seen traveling together, most likely searching for Soiree and Jivatma.

Throughout the game, Luise shows that she is obviously not human as she can teleport herself and others, float, project bursts of energy, and dash in different directions several times in the air. Her abilities are also not recognized by other magical characters, like Mignon or Athena.

Nagase 

 is an N-Type Enforced Human transformed by one of Addes's sub-syndicates, Belphegor. Her battle abilities are thanks to a Battle Disc System (where she saves and collects data about fighters) and her genetically enhanced strength. Nagase is an arrogant and insolent young girl who doesn't care to be loyal to Jivatma or any of Addes. The only reason Nagase fights under Jivatma's orders is to test the limits of her own power.

Her normal model is based upon the design found on a honey bee while her Another outfit's motif of frogs is another instance of ninja being associated with these animals in fiction. Nagase was created to "fit the times" and adjust to the newer tone of the sequel's approach for story telling. She was taken from one of Falcoon's old sketches and is in Ureshino's words, "a very Falcoon design". Her namesake was written to follow the same vein as an item found in a new mecha anime. Compared to other characters in the series, Nagase is referred to as the "new modern" female character, due to her expertise with computers and her overall aloofness to her benefactors.

Nagase's moves and techniques are almost all taken from Hattori Hanzo (who is a secret character in this game) with the exception of a set of counter-attack styled Desperation Moves. She possesses all of Hanzo's signature attacks, including his bouncing fire balls, aerial shuriken throws, teleporting attacks, invisibility and Hanzo's infamous ninja pile driver, the Shrike Dash.

She seems to be the rival of Kula Diamond as shown in Kula's story battle and in their pre-fight quotes when these two fighters will be active in any kind of battle except for story battle.

Ninon Beart

 is the younger sister of Mignon Beart and appears as an unlockable playable character in KOF: Maximum Impact 2. Ninon also appears in the dating simulation game, Days of Memories~Pure White Angels.

Similar to Nagase, her design was pulled from Falcoon's storage of illustrations that were unused from previous works. She was created to flesh out Mignon's backstory, as she serves as a rival as well as a second account to Mignon's progress. Her first in-game model put a heavy strain on their computers' rendering capacity, and thus required several retakes.

She is, in terms of personality, the exact opposite from her sister as she is a cool and mature nihilist. She dresses in Gothic Lolita clothing, greatly contradicting the cheerful idol-style clothing her sister wears. She is also more adept at magic than her sister, a trait that she often refers to hauntingly in a show of superiority. To Ninon's joy, it is Athena who once again receives an invitation to the KOF tournament. Ninon enters to prove to her rival that she is not only the superior witch, but also the superior fighter.

Several of Ninon's voiceovers during her techniques reference angels, as Michael, Uriel, Raphael and Gabriel, although her actual movenames do not, perhaps this is a localization error.

Xiao Lon 

Xiao Lon (Pinyin: Xiàolóng; Japanese: シャオロン Shaoron) first appears as a selectable character in KOF: Maximum Impact Regulation "A". She is a member of the Flying Brigands assassination group and one of the known daughters to the group's leader, Ron and half-sister of Duo Lon. Her appearance in the expansion has been noted as the developers' way of loosely linking the Maximum Impact series with its 2D predecessor. She fights using weapons concealed underneath her long sleeves, mimicking attacks used by her father and brother.

Other characters
Some characters that appear in these titles are variants to other existing characters such as the hardy Armor Ralf and the second Mr. Karate. Another version of Kyo Kusanagi based on his older appearances -named "Classic Kyo", the Garou: Mark of the Wolves version of Terry Bogard -listed as "Wild Wolf", and the recurring "Nightmare" version of Geese Howard also appear as separate characters.

Characters listed below are characters who have appeared from other SNK associated titles. The Maximum Impact series marks their first and only playable entry in The King of Fighters series, thus they are listed here.

Fiolina Germi

Hanzo Hattori

Lilly Kane

 is the younger sister of Billy Kane and appears as an unlockable playable character in KOF: Maximum Impact 2, before that she first appeared as a striker for Hinako Shijou in The King of Fighters 2000.

Lilly, like her brother, is originally from England, but the two immigrated to the United States; eventually taking up residence in Southtown. While there, she ends up dating Joe Higashi much to her brother's chagrin. Seeking peace, Lilly later returns to the United Kingdom with Billy. Currently, she is unaware of her brother's criminal pursuits while serving his former employer, Geese Howard.

In order to contrast Lilly with her brother, she wields a laundry drying pole which can split into three smaller poles. She can also infuse her weapon attacks with ice to further contrast her with Billy's fire attacks.

Makoto Mizoguchi

Richard Meyer

Rock Howard

References

KOF: Maximum Impact